"Marenariello" is a Neapolitan song written in 1893 by Gennaro Ottaviano (words) and Salvatore Gambardella (music). American singer Perry Como included this song in his album Perry Como in Italy in 1966.

The song was adapted into the English language hit "I Have But One Heart" and was sung by Andrea Bocelli on his first classical album Viaggio Italiano released in 1997. A Dutch version, "Het vissermeisje", was a hit in the 1930s for Joseph Schmidt.

Text of the song

References

Neapolitan songs